Ivan Hlinka (January 26, 1950 – August 16, 2004) was a Czech professional ice hockey player and coach. He is considered to be one of the most important figures in Czech ice hockey history. A big centre, his playing style was comparable to Phil Esposito, often scoring with shots from the slot.

Playing career
Hlinka began to play ice hockey at a young age. When he was six years old, he was playing HC Litvínov's youth team. He played in Czechoslovak league for the first time when he was 16.

At age 20, he became a captain Litvínov's men's team and played in the Czechoslovak national team for the first time. He played 256 games as a member of the Czechoslovak national team and scored 132 goals in international games. He also played in 544 games in Czechoslovak league and scored 347 times. Hlinka was named the Golden Hockey Stick winner as the country's top player in 1978.

Hlinka helped the Czechoslovak team to win world titles in 1972, 1976, and 1977. As a member of the Czechoslovak team, he won an Olympic bronze medal in 1972 and a silver medal in 1976.

Hlinka played in the inaugural Canada Cup tournament in 1976, the international tournament in which the best available players competed for their countries (most notably, players from the National Hockey League). Canada defeated Czechoslovakia in the best-of-three final two games to nothing, with scores of 6–0 and 5–4. The following year, he was named the national team's captain, a position he held from 1977 to 1980.

In 1981, Hlinka and fellow Czech Jiří Bubla joined the NHL's Vancouver Canucks. This started the Czech migration to the NHL. They were the first Czechoslovak players to compete in the NHL with the permission of their country's authorities. (Jaroslav Jiřík played legally in the NHL in the 1969–70 season, but only in three games.) Playing in his first NHL season, Hlinka set a Canucks record for the most points by a rookie with 60 (later matched by Pavel Bure in 1991–92). During the subsequent 1982 Stanley Cup playoffs, the Canucks advanced to the Finals against the New York Islanders. In a losing effort (Vancouver lost the series in four straight games), Hlinka became the first Czech to ever play in the Stanley Cup Finals (Bubla did not play in them). The following season, Hlinka improved to 63 points over 65 games. In his two years in the NHL, Hlinka totalled 42 goals and assisted on 81 others in 137 games.

Hlinka returned to Europe to finish his playing career due to problems with his back in 1983. He played in Swiss team EV Zug until 1985, when he returned to Litvínov where he started his coaching career.

Coaching career
After his return to Czechoslovakia, Hlinka began to coach in "his" HC Litvínov. Later, he coached temporarily in Freiburg, Germany.

Hlinka also became very famous for his trick in the 1986–87 season. Litvínov was in last place in the standings of the Czechoslovak league. Hlinka, already 37 years old, began to play again. Litvínov immediately improved its game and went unbeaten in Hlinka's first eight games (six wins and two ties). Altogether, he played 19 games and scored 23 points.

In the 1990s, Hlinka was head coach of Czechoslovak and later Czech national teams. His teams won bronze medals at the Albertville Olympics and the World Championships in 1992 and 1993. He left the national team after an unsuccessful World Championship in 1994.

Hlinka returned in 1997 and his team won the bronze medal at the World Championship again. Hlinka became a national hero when his team won the gold medal at the Nagano Olympics; the first time that the NHL agreed to release its players for the Games. The triumph was celebrated by the whole nation. The dominance of the Czech hockey team in the world was confirmed in May 1999 when Hlinka's team won the World Championship again.

In 2000–01, Hlinka returned to the NHL as head coach of the Pittsburgh Penguins. He and Alpo Suhonen became the second and third Europeans to ever coach in the NHL, following Johnny Gottselig. His first season also coincided with Mario Lemieux's return to the NHL, and together they made a surprising run to the Eastern Conference Finals, knocking off the higher seeded Washington Capitals and Buffalo Sabres along the way before falling to the New Jersey Devils. The next season was not successful, as the struggling small-market Penguins had traded their superstar, Jaromír Jágr. Hlinka himself was criticized by Lemieux for not taking classes in the summer to improve his English and that contributed to the frosty relationship between them. He was fired four games into the 2001–02 season and returned to Europe.

In 2001–02, he worked as general manager of Czech national team and, in 2002–03, he coached Russian team Avangard Omsk for one season.

Coaching record

Death
Hlinka was supposed to be once again head coach of the Czech national team in the 2004–05 season. However, he died on August 16, 2004, at age 54 when his car collided head-on with a Daewoo Avia truck driving the wrong way on the E48 highway 200 yards from the town of Karlovy Vary, Czech Republic. He had gone to Karlovy Vary to ensure that Jaromír Jágr would participate in the 2004 World Cup of Hockey. The truck suddenly appeared in Hlinka's lane. The truck driver claimed that he had to avoid a collision with an animal. More likely (the court was inclined to believe this), he turned from the main road and made a left at an intersection where it was prohibited. Hlinka was not using a safety belt, but according to experts, it would not have prevented his death.

Acknowledgement and awards
 Czechoslovak Player of the Year (1977–78)
 All-Star Centre at the 1978 IIHF World Championship
 Inducted to the IIHF Hall of Fame (2002)
 Czech Ice Hockey Legend (2004)
 Ivan Hlinka Memorial Tournament for national U18 ice hockey teams named after him
 Ivan Hlinka Stadion, arena of HC Litvínov is named after him

Records
 Vancouver Canucks team record for most points by a rookie (60) (surpassed by Elias Pettersson during the 2018–19 NHL season).

Career statistics

Regular season and playoffs

International

Career coaching statistics
 World Championships: 1 gold (1999), 4 bronzes (1992, 1993, 1997, 1998).
 Olympics: gold (1998), bronze (1992)

Quotes about Hlinka
"It's not that he was just a coach, but he was sort of like Herb Brooks was for America." – Tomáš Vokoun
"Ivan Hlinka was a tremendous ambassador for the game of hockey." – Craig Patrick, general manager of the Pittsburgh Penguins
"He was a real high-quality player. He probably never got the billing over here he should have. You look back on his hockey career on both sides of the pond and he had quite a resume." – Tiger Williams

Quotes of Hlinka
"We had a small problem that we didn't know whether Jarda Jágr would go fifth or Vláďa Růžička would go fifth but then, I would say, a respect overpoised because when Vláďa Růžička said he wanted to go fifth, then Džegr said he would go fourth. Patýs was a bit surprised when we democratically elected him to go because he hadn't played at the end and I believed he can score with a techniques somewhat." – About a penalty shooting against Canada at Nagano Olympics.
"It doesn't happen very often at us but we had a bigger will to win than Canada had." – After a win against Canada at Nagano Olympics.
"I got information about numbers of people standing at various places at home in the beginning of the game. So we thank them that they crossed their fingers for us, it was probably somehow worthy and we will be proud again that we are Czechs and it will not be just because of the hockey." – After a win of golden Olympic medals at Nagano Olympics.

References

External links
 
 
 Hockey History: Ivan Hlinka
 
 
 

1950 births
2004 deaths
Czech ice hockey centres
Czech ice hockey coaches
Czech Republic men's national ice hockey team coaches
Czechoslovak expatriate sportspeople in Canada
Czechoslovak expatriate sportspeople in Switzerland
Czechoslovak ice hockey centres
Czechoslovakia men's national ice hockey team coaches
EV Zug players
HC Litvínov players
Ice hockey players at the 1972 Winter Olympics
Ice hockey players at the 1976 Winter Olympics
IIHF Hall of Fame inductees
Medalists at the 1972 Winter Olympics
Medalists at the 1976 Winter Olympics
Olympic bronze medalists for Czechoslovakia
Olympic gold medalists for Czechoslovakia
Olympic ice hockey players of Czechoslovakia
Olympic medalists in ice hockey
Olympic silver medalists for Czechoslovakia
Sportspeople from Most (city)
Pittsburgh Penguins coaches
Recipients of Medal of Merit (Czech Republic)
Road incident deaths in the Czech Republic
Undrafted National Hockey League players
Vancouver Canucks players
Czechoslovak expatriate ice hockey people